Moa Tuva Amanda Gammel, (born 6 October 1980) is a Swedish actress. She made her acting debut in the 1996 Mikael Håfström film Skuggornas hus and then acted in the soap opera Vita lögner on TV3. Her breakthrough came in the 2006 film by Johan Brisinger called Underbara Älskade. She also had roles in Sommaren med Göran in 2009 opposite David Hellenius. In 2015, she had a lead role in the drama series Jordskott.

Filmography

Films
1999: Sherdil
2003: Jesus från Hökarängen
2005: Barn av vår tid
2006: Underbara älskade
2007: Beck – Det tysta skriket
2007: Teater Pseudo - Sex
2007: Pyramiden
2007: Ungdomens förfarare
2008: Pälsen
2009: Sommaren med Göran
2010: A-kassekungen
2010: Att sträcka ut en hand
2010: Juni
2010: Lapland Odyssey
2010: Puss
2011: Umeå4ever
2012: Prime Time
2013: Hemma
2014: Kärlek deluxe
2014: Tommy

TV series
1994: Bullen 
1995: Du bestämmer 
1996: Skuggornas hus 
2000–2001: Vita lögner
2000: Pusselbitar
2000: Labyrinten
2000: Brottsvåg
2007: Ett gott parti
2008: Oskyldigt dömd
2009: Livet i Fagervik
2011: Irene Huss series
 Irene Huss: En man med litet ansikte
 Irene Huss: Den som vakar i mörkret
 Irene Huss: Det lömska nätet
 Irene Huss: I skydd av skuggorna
 Irene Huss: Jagat vittne
 Irene Huss: Tystnadens cirkel
2015: Jordskott
2017: Jordskott II

Theatre
1992: Pippi Långstrump as Annika

References

External links

Moa Gammel on Svensk Filmdatabas

Living people
1980 births
20th-century Swedish actresses
21st-century Swedish actresses
Swedish film actresses
Swedish television actresses
Swedish soap opera actresses
Actresses from Stockholm